Sommariva is an Italian surname. Notable people with the surname include:

 Daniele Sommariva (born 1997), Italian association football player
 Emilio Sommariva (1883 – 1956), Italian painter and photographer
 Giovanni Battista Sommariva (died 1826), Italian politician of the Cisalpine Republic and a arts patron
 Lorenzo Sommariva (born 1993), Italian snowboarder
 Stefano Sommariva (1918 – 2007), Italian cross-country skier

See also 

 Riva (surname)
 Sommariva (disambiguation)

Italian-language surnames